Chunerpeton tianyiensis is an extinct species of salamander from the Late Jurassic Daohugou Beds in Ningcheng County, Nei Mongol (Inner Mongolia), China. It is the only species classified under the genus Chunerpeton. It was a small animal measuring 18 cm in length. It was neotenic, with the retention of external gills into adulthood. In the original description it was placed in Cryptobranchidae, which contains modern giant salamanders. A redescription published in 2020 found it to be a stem-group caudatan outside the crown group of modern salamanders. A 2021 study found it to be a member of Cryptobranchoidea outside of Cryptobranchidae. In 2022 a more extensive analysis, with greater character and taxon sampling, recovered Chunerpeton tianyiense as a stem-group caudatan, outside the crown group of modern salamanders, and associated with Beiyanerpeton jianpingensis and Qinglongtriton gangouensis. 

Chunerpeton tianyiensis has  been used to constrain the age of Cryptobranchoidea by over a dozen molecular divergence analyses but given the uncertain affinity of the taxon perhaps it should no longer be used in this way. 

It lived with likely stem-group salamanders, e.g. Jeholotriton paradoxus Wang 2000, Liaoxitriton daohugouensis Wang 2004, and Pangerpeton sinensis Wang & Evans 2006 of the same age.

References

Further reading 

 
 

Cryptobranchoidea
Prehistoric amphibian genera
Jurassic amphibians of Asia
Jurassic salamanders
Fossil taxa described in 2003